The 2007 Copa Perú season, the promotion tournament of Peruvian football.

The tournament has 5 stages. The first four stages are played as mini-league round-robin tournaments, except for third stage in region IV, which is played as a knockout stage. The final stage features two knockout rounds and a final four-team group stage to determine the two promoted teams.

The 2007 Peru Cup started with the District Stage on February. The next stage was the Provincial Stage which started, on June. The tournament continued with the Departamental Stage on July. The Regional Staged followed. The National Stage started on November. The winner and runner-up of the National Stage will be promoted to the First Division.

Departmental Stage
The following list shows the teams that qualified for the Regional Stage.

Regional Stage
The following list shows the teams that qualified for the Regional Stage.

Region I 
Region I includes qualified teams from Amazonas, Lambayeque, Tumbes and Piura region.

Group A

Group B

Regional Final

Región II 
Region II includes qualified teams from Ancash, Cajamarca, La Libertad and San Martín region.

Group A

Group B

Region III 
Region III includes qualified teams from Loreto and Ucayali region.

Región IV 
Region IV includes qualified teams from Lima and Callao region. This region played as a knockout cup system and the finalists qualified.

First Stage

Semifinals

Regional Final

Región V 
Region V includes qualified teams from Junín, Pasco and Huánuco region.

Group A

Group B

Tiebreaker

Regional Final

Región VI 
Region VI includes qualified teams from Ayacucho, Huancavelica and Ica region. Two teams qualified from this stage.

Group A

Group B

Regional Final

Región VII 
Region VII includes qualified teams from Arequipa, Moquegua and Tacna region.

Group A

Group B

Semifinals

Regional Final

Región VIII 
Region VIII includes qualified teams from Apurímac, Cusco, Madre de Dios and Puno region.

Group A

Group B

Regional Final

National Stage
The National Stage started in November. The winners of the National Stage were promoted to the First Division. The runner-up played against the Second Division runner-up in which the winner would go to the First Division and the loser would join the Second Division.

Promotion Playoff (2nd Copa Peru / 2nd Segunda Division) 

 Atlético Minero to Primera Division and Sport Águila to Segunda Division.

External links
  Copa Peru 2007
  FutbolPeruano.com
  Semanario Pasión

Copa Perú seasons
2007 domestic association football cups
Cop